Ahmed Mubarak Obaid al-Mahaijri (born 23 February 1985), commonly known as Ahmed Mubarak or Ahmed Kano, is an Omani professional footballer who plays for Al-Markhiya as a midfielder.

Club career
Kano has previously played for various clubs in GCC countries with clubs like Al-Wehda Club, Al-Ahli SC, Al-Fateh SC and Ettifaq FC of KSA, Al Ain S.C.C. and Dubai C.S.C. of the UAE, Al-Wakra, Al Rayyan Sports Club and Al-Sailiya Sport Club of Qatar and Al Naser Sporting Club of Kuwait. On 5 September 2013, he signed a one-year contract with 2012–13 Oman Elite League runners-up Fanja SC. On 13 July 2014, he signed a one-year contract with his first professional club Al-Oruba SC.

International career
Kano was a part of the first team squad of the Oman national football team. He was selected for the national team for the first time in 2003, along with Ahmed Hadid, Badar Al-Maimani and Ali Al-Habsi.

Arabian Gulf Cup

Kano has made appearances in the 2003, 2004, 2007, 2009, 2010, 2013, 2014, and the 2017 editions of the Arabian Gulf Cup.
In the 2003 edition of the tournament, he scored one goal in an important 2−0 win against the United Arab Emirates. In the 2014 edition, he scored one goal in a close 1−1 draw against Iraq. And in the 2017 edition, he managed to score a critical penalty kick in a difficult 1−0 win against the hosts Kuwait.

Kano won the most valuable player award of the 2017 Gulf Cup for his role in the success of the Omani team tournament campaign.

AFC Asian Cup
Kano has made appearances in the 2004 Asian Cup qualifiers, the 2004 Asian Cup, the 2007 Asian Cup qualifiers, the 2007 Asian Cup, the 2011 Asian Cup qualifiers, the 2015 Asian Cup qualifiers, the 2015 Asian Cup, and the 2019 Asian Cup qualifiers.

FIFA World Cup qualification
Kano has made a total of four appearances in the 2006 FIFA World Cup qualifiers, six in the 2010 FIFA World Cup qualifiers and fourteen in the 2014 FIFA World Cup qualifiers.
In the 2010 FIFA World Cup qualifiers, he scored one goal in a 1−1 draw against Japan.
He scored three goals in the 2014 FIFA World Cup qualifiers. The first one came in the second round of the FIFA World Cup qualifiers in a 2−0 win over Myanmar, and the other two goals were scored in the fourth round of the FIFA World Cup qualifiers, one in a 2−1 win over Jordan and another in a 1−2 loss against Japan. Oman entered the last game of group play with a chance to qualify for at least the playoff-round, but a 1−0 loss to Jordan eliminated them from the competition.

Career statistics

Club

International 

Scores and results list Oman's goal tally first, score column indicates score after each Kano goal.

Notes:

Honours

Club
Al-Oruba
Omani League (1): 2001–02; Runners-up 2000–01
Sultan Qaboos Cup (1): 2001; Runners-up 2000
Oman Super Cup (2): 2000, 2002

Al-Ain
UAE Pro League Runners-up: 2004-05
UAE President's Cup (1): 2005
UAE Federation Cup (1): 2005
AFC Champions League Runners-up: 2005

Al-Rayyan
Emir of Qatar Cup (1): 2006
Sheikh Jassem Cup Runners-up: 2006

Al-Sailiya
Sheikh Jassem Cup Runners-up: 2007

Al-Ahli
Saudi Crown Prince Cup Runners-up: 2010

Al-Ettifaq
Saudi Crown Prince Cup Runners-up: 2012

Fanja
Sultan Qaboos Cup (1): 2013

See also
 List of men's footballers with 100 or more international caps

References

External links
 
 
 Ahmed Mubarak at Goal.com
 
 
 Ahmed Mubarak Al-Mahaijri - ASIAN CUP Australia 2015

1985 births
Living people
Omani footballers
Oman international footballers
Omani expatriate footballers
Association football midfielders
2004 AFC Asian Cup players
2007 AFC Asian Cup players
2015 AFC Asian Cup players
Al-Orouba SC players
Al-Wehda Club (Mecca) players
Al Ain FC players
Al-Rayyan SC players
Al-Sailiya SC players
Al-Ahli Saudi FC players
Al-Fateh SC players
Al-Nasr SC (Kuwait) players
Ettifaq FC players
Fanja SC players
Qatar Stars League players
Saudi Professional League players
Oman Professional League players
UAE Pro League players
Qatari Second Division players
Expatriate footballers in the United Arab Emirates
Omani expatriate sportspeople in the United Arab Emirates
Expatriate footballers in Qatar
Omani expatriate sportspeople in Qatar
Expatriate footballers in Kuwait
Muaither SC players
Mesaimeer SC players
Al-Markhiya SC players
Omani expatriate sportspeople in Kuwait
Expatriate footballers in Saudi Arabia
Omani expatriate sportspeople in Saudi Arabia
Footballers at the 2006 Asian Games
FIFA Century Club
2019 AFC Asian Cup players
Asian Games competitors for Oman
People from Sur, Oman
Kuwait Premier League players